Yung Warriors (also called Tjimba and the Yung Warriors) are an Australian hip hop group, formed in 2007.

They released their debut album Warrior for Life in June 2007.

Yung Warriors played at 2008 Big Day Out, at Yabun in Sydney, and at the World Indigenous Peoples Conference: Education in Melbourne Their music has had national airplay on Triple J.

They were nominated for Deadly Awards in 2008 and 2009.

Members
Tjimba Possum Burns
Danny Ramzan
Kidd Benny
Former members
Narjiic Day-Burns

Discography

Studio albums

Singles

Awards and nominations

AIR Awards
The Australian Independent Record Awards (commonly known informally as AIR Awards) is an annual awards night to recognise, promote and celebrate the success of Australia's Independent Music sector.

|-
| AIR Awards of 2012
|Standing Strong 
| Best Independent Hip Hop/Urban Album
|

Music Victoria Awards
The Music Victoria Awards are an annual awards night celebrating Victorian music. They commenced in 2006.

|-
| Music Victoria Awards of 2013
| Yung Warriors
| Best Indigenous Act
| 
|}

References

External links
Young Warriors

Victoria (Australia) musical groups
Indigenous Australian musical groups
Musical groups from Melbourne
Musical groups established in 2007